Distichodus is a genus of freshwater fish in the family Distichodontidae found in Africa.

Species
There are currently 23 recognized species in this genus:

Distichodus affinis Günther, 1873 (Silver distichodus)
Distichodus altus Boulenger, 1899
Distichodus antonii Schilthuis, 1891
Distichodus atroventralis Boulenger, 1898
Distichodus brevipinnis Günther, 1864
Distichodus decemmaculatus Pellegrin, 1926 (Dwarf distichodus)
Distichodus engycephalus Günther, 1864 
Distichodus fasciolatus Boulenger, 1898 (Sharktail distichodus)
Distichodus hypostomatus Pellegrin, 1900
Distichodus kolleri Holly, 1926
Distichodus langi Nichols & Griscom, 1917
Distichodus lusosso Schilthuis, 1891 (Longsnout distichodus)
Distichodus maculatus Boulenger, 1898 (Spotted citharinid)
Distichodus mossambicus W. K. H. Peters, 1852 (Nkupe)
Distichodus nefasch (Bonnaterre, 1788)
Distichodus noboli Boulenger, 1899
Distichodus notospilus Günther, 1867
Distichodus petersii Pfeffer, 1896
Distichodus rostratus Günther, 1864 (Grass-eater)
Distichodus rufigiensis Norman, 1922
Distichodus schenga W. K. H. Peters, 1852 (Chessa)
Distichodus sexfasciatus Boulenger, 1897 (Banded distichodus)
Distichodus teugelsi Mamonekene & Vreven, 2008

References

 
Distichodontidae
Taxonomy articles created by Polbot